Tagelus subteres, common name lesser tagelus, is a species of saltwater clam, a marine bivalve mollusc belonging to the family Solecurtidae.

Description
These small and compact shells shows violet rays and a glossy periostracum.

Distribution
This species can be found in the East Pacific.

References

Huber, M. (2010). Compendium of bivalves. A full-color guide to 3,300 of the world’s marine bivalves. A status on Bivalvia after 250 years of research. Hackenheim: ConchBooks. 901 pp.

Solecurtidae
Bivalves described in 1837